This article lists individual aircraft of historical or technical significance located in Switzerland.

The list constituting the basis of this article was drafted by the Swiss Federal Office for Civil Protection (FOCP) in the course of the 2008 review of the Swiss Inventory of Cultural Property of National and Regional Significance. The Swiss Committee for the Protection of Cultural Goods decided not to include aircraft in the public review draft of the Inventory and made the corresponding list available separately.

References

Aviation in Switzerland
Switzerland
Aircraft